Gerhard Dietrich (born 12 May 1942) is a German former gymnast. He competed at the 1968 Summer Olympics in all artistic gymnastics events and won a bronze medal with the East German team. Individually his best achievement was 20th place on the pommel horse. He won four more bronze medals at the world championships in 1966 and 1970 and European championships in 1967.

References

1942 births
Living people
German male artistic gymnasts
Olympic gymnasts of East Germany
Gymnasts at the 1968 Summer Olympics
Olympic bronze medalists for East Germany
Olympic medalists in gymnastics
Medalists at the 1968 Summer Olympics
Medalists at the World Artistic Gymnastics Championships
Sportspeople from Brandenburg an der Havel